A puppet is an inanimate object or representational figure animated by a puppeteer.

Puppet may also refer to:

Entertainment
 Hand puppet, a type of puppet controlled by hand that occupies the interior of the puppet
 Puppetry, a form of theatre or performance which involves the manipulation of puppets
 Sock puppet, a puppet made from a sock

Computing and Internet
 Puppet (software), an open source configuration management utility by Puppet, Inc
 Sock puppet account, an online identity used for purposes of deception within an online community

Film and television
 Puppets (1916 film), an American short drama film directed by Tod Browning
 Puppets (1926 film), an American silent drama film directed by George Archainbaud
 Puppet (film), a 1957 Argentine comedy film
 Puppets (TV series), a weekly Russian TV show
 Puppet, one of the main characters in The Upside Down Show

Music
 "The Puppet", a 1980 song by Echo & the Bunnymen
 "Puppet", a 1993 song by Lisa Germano from Happiness
 "Puppet", a 1998 song by Ringo Starr from Vertical Man
 "Puppet", a 2001 song by Thousand Foot Krutch from Set It Off
 "Puppet", a 2010 song by The Saturdays from Headlines!
 "Puppet", a 2013 song by Jake Miller from Us Against Them
 "Puppet", a 2014 song by Karmin from Pulses
 "Puppets", a 1971 song by Curved Air from Second Album
 "Puppets", a 1979 song by Hugh Cornwell and Robert Williams from Nosferatu
 "Puppets", a 1981 song by Depeche Mode from Speak & Spell
 "Puppets", a 1998 song by Hum from Downward Is Heavenward
 "Puppets", a 2004 song by Joseph Arthur from Our Shadows Will Remain
 "Puppets", a 2008 song by Atmosphere from When Life Gives You Lemons, You Paint That Shit Gold
 "Puppets (The First Snow)", a 2010 song by Motionless in White from Creatures
 Puppet, a 2011 album by The Dreaming
 "Puppet", a 2019 song by Tyler, the Creator from Igor

Other uses
 Puppet (artist) (born 1970), Swedish graffiti artist
 Puppet state, a nominal sovereignty controlled effectively by a foreign power
 Puppet bid, a conventional bid in the card game contract bridge
 Puppets (module), a 1989 module for the Dungeons & Dragons fantasy role-playing game
 Puppet, the ring name of Stevie Lee, a midget wrestler